Tallapaka may refer to:

 Tallapaka, India, Rajampet mandal, Kadapa district in Andhra Pradesh, India

Tallapaka is also an Indian surname and may refer to:

 Tallapaka Annamacharya, the first Carnatic music composer
 Tallapaka Tirumalamma, the first Telugu women poet

Indian surnames